The geology of South Korea includes rocks dating to the Archean and two large massifs of metamorphic rock as the crystalline basement, overlain by thick sedimentary sequences, younger metamorphic rocks and volcanic deposits. Although extent is small, Geology is diverse, and there are diverse rocks that were formed during the Precambrian to Cenozoic Era in the Korea Peninsula.

Geologic History, Stratigraphy and Tectonics
The K'yŏnggi Massif and Yongnam Massif lie north and south of the Okch'on-T'aebaeksan Zone respectively. They are both polymetamorphic gneiss and schist complexes from the Precambrian and underlie the entire Republic of Korea. Units range in age from the Archean to the Proterozoic, with metamorphic facies from greenschist to amphibolite grade. Some geologists have attempted to correlate the rocks with North China-North Korea Paraplatform and Yangtze Paraplatform rocks although these categorizations are uncertain.

Precambrian (–539 million years ago) 
The rate which Precambrian rocks occupy in Korean Peninsula is 40%. It is confirmed that Korea peninsula is formed mostly after Paleoproterozoic (2,500 to 1,600 million years ago) and Archean rocks appear in portion region.

Paleozoic (539–251 million years ago) 

The rock formation which is formed during Paleozoic is composed of Joseon Supergroup (lower) and Pyeongan Supergroup (upper).

Joseon Supergroup 
From the early Cambrian to the Ordovician in the early Paleozoic, the Joseon Supergroup was formed, and it distributed in the Pyeongnam Basin and Okcheon Fold Belt. The early Paleozoic Joseon Supergroup in Korea has been divided into Taebaek, Yeongwol, Pyeongchang, Yongtan and Mungyeong groups, depending on the sequence of lithology. Taebaek group that located in Taebaek, Samcheok is composed of Jangsan, Myobong, Daegi, Sesong, Hwajeol, Dongjeom, Dumugol (Dumu-dong), Makgol (Makgol), Jigunsan, Duwibong Formation. Yeongwol group is composed of Sambangsan, Machari, Wagok, Mungok, Yeongheung Formation. The geological table of the Joseon Supergroup is as follows.

Pyeongan Supergroup 

From Carboniferous to Triassic, The Pyeongan Supergroup was formed, and it distributed in the Pyeongnam Basin and Okcheon Folded Zone.

The geological table and stratigraphy of the Pyeongan Supergroup are as follows.

Okchon (folded) Zone 
The Okch'ŏn Zone likely formed in mid-Cambrian times with faulting, interpreted from olistolith limestone breccia.
By contrast to the Chŏsun Supergroup, the Okch'ŏn Supergroup crops out in the central Okch'on-T'aebaeksan Zone with thick sequences of metasedimentary and metavolcanic rocks. Some geologists have interpreted the supergroup as a series of nappe formations that took shape in a Cambrian intracratonic basin. Above the volcanic and sedimentary sequence in the middle part of the supergroup are jumbled rocks formed from submarine debris flows during rifting and contain granite, gneiss, quartzite, limestone, mudstone and basic volcanic rock fragments.

At first, the Taebo orogeny was credited with the folding, thrusting and metamorphism but Cluzel, Jolivet and Cadet in 1991 named the Okch'on orogeny to explain Silurian and Devonian deformation.

South Korea has no Silurian or Devonian sedimentary rocks, but sedimentation began again on a sinking paralic platform inland from the proto-Japan as it formed beginning in the Carboniferous. The P'yŏngan Supergroup outcrops northeast of the Okch'on Zone, subdivided into the Hongjom Formation gray mudstone, limestone and mudstone, Sadong Formation sandstone, mudstone and coal seams, Kobangsan Formation coarse terrestrial sandstone and mudstone, and Nogam Formation green sandstone and mudstone.

Mesozoic (251-66 million years ago)
In the Triassic at beginning of the Mesozoic as sedimentation continued in the P'yŏngan Supergroup, the Sŏngnim tectonic event affected the Okch'on-T'aebaeksan Zone, although it only caused slight faulting and warping of the  major supergroup strata. Geologists have inferred that the event was related to deformation further west in Indonesia.

The event generated dextral strike-slip faulting in intermontane troughs in the Kyonggi Massif in which the terrestrial sediments of the Taedong Supergroup accumulated. The rocks in the basin include two sequences of conglomerate grading to sandstone, mudstone and coal beds. The Taedong Supergroup has extensive fossils, particularly crustaceans.

Taebo Orogeny 
The Taebo orogeny in the Jurassic is broadly similar to the Yenshanian tectonism in China, although its effects are believed to have been less dramatic. The event ended with the batholith intrusions of the Taebo granites which outcrop over 30 percent of the country.

Gyeongsang Basin 

The Gyeongsang Basin is the basin that is formed at Cretaceous. it occupies most of the Yeongnam region and part of Honam region.

The Gyeongsang Basin is composed of Gyeongsang supergroup, which consists of Sindong, Hayang, Yucheon group, and Bulguksa Granite. The Sindong Group is the lowest stratigraphic sequence in the Cretaceous Gyeongsang Basin and comprises three stratigraphic units: the Nakdong, Hasandong, and Jinju Formation in ascending order. Hayang group is mid group of Gyeongsang supergroup. Yucheon group is the top group of Gyeongsang supergroup.

Kyŏngsang rocks are intruded by microlite, diorite and granodiorite from the late Cretaceous.

Cenozoic (66 million years ago-present)
Volcanic activity continued into the Cenozoic ending 50 million years ago. No Paleogene sedimentary rocks have been found onshore. Yangbuk Group conglomerates and alluvial fan sediments gathered in small fault-bounded basins in the Miocene. During the last 2.5 million years of the Quaternary, Cheju and other offshore islands formed from volcanism.

References